Ayats is the trading name of Carrocerías Ayats SA, a Spain-based coachbuilder. The company constructs a range of coach bodies on a variety of chassis, and also manufacture their own integral products. Their products are used throughout Europe. The company was established in 1905 by Mr. Juan Ayats in Arbúcies, a village in the Selva county of the province of Girona, Catalonia, Spain. This small town offered the advantage of being in the midst of a densely forested area ("Selva" means "forest" or "jungle" in Catalan), useful since the bodyworks were made of wood at the time. Ayats is one of several coachbuilders based in Arbúcies; others include Indcar (the oldest of them), Beulas,  Noge and Boari.

Ayats Bravos have been used for a number of years as the platform for specialist double deck coaches including open top buses and sleeper buses. The Ayats Bravo City was the first purpose-built open top low-floor tour bus, introduced by the worldwide sightseeing operator City Sightseeing.

Products
Atlantis
Atlas 2
Ayats Air256
Ayats Bravo
 Bravo 1
 Bravo 2
 Bravo 3 (the unofficial name for the Bravo 1 with the Megaloader walk-in loading bay).
 Bravo City/Urbis
Platinum
Ayats Eclipse
Jupiter
Olympia

External links
Official Ayats website (in English)

Bus manufacturers of Spain
Vehicle manufacturing companies established in 1905
Spanish brands
Spanish companies established in 1905